WDDQ (92.1 FM) is a radio station broadcasting a talk format. Licensed to Adel, Georgia, United States, the station serves the Valdosta, Georgia area. The station is currently owned by Smalltown Broadcasting, LLC.

References

External links

DDQ
Talk radio stations in the United States
Radio stations established in 1980
1980 establishments in Georgia (U.S. state)